Antonio Napolioni (born 11 December 1957) has been the elected bishop of the Roman Catholic Diocese of Cremona since 16 November 2015. He replaced the most rev. Dante Lafranconi.;

Biography 

Born in 1957, he started to study Law at University of Camerino, and after two years he entered in the seminary of Fano.

He was ordained priest on 25 June 1983. From 2005 he is chaplain of His Holiness and from 2010 parson in Saint Severino bishop church in San Severino Marche.

He was appointed bishop of Cremona on 16 November 2015. He received his episcopal consecration from Emeritus Bishop Dante Lafranconi.

He was infected with, and had severe respiratory symptoms from, the COVID-19 novel coronavirus disease, from which he is now recovering. He remains under quarantine at his residence, and will be retested to make sure he is fully recovered.

Note

Resources
Profile of Mons. Napolioni www.catholic-hierarchy.org
Official page of diocese of Cremona

1957 births
Living people
Bishops of Cremona
20th-century Italian Roman Catholic bishops
People from the Province of Macerata
University of Camerino alumni